Virgil Marmocea (1909 – 1998) was a Romanian racing cyclist. He rode in the 1936 Tour de France.

References

1909 births
1998 deaths
Romanian male cyclists
Place of birth missing